Walcrow River, a watercourse of the Manning River catchment, is located in the Northern Tablelands and Mid North Coast districts of New South Wales, Australia.

Course and features
Walcrow River rises within the Tia Range on the eastern slopes of the Great Dividing Range, below Mount Carrington, south southeast of Walcha and flows generally southeast by south, before reaching its confluence with the Cooplacurripa River, north of Giro, northwest of Taree. The river descends  over its  course.

See also 

 Rivers of New South Wales
 List of rivers of New South Wales (L–Z)
 List of rivers of Australia

References

Rivers of New South Wales
Northern Tablelands
Mid North Coast
Mid-Coast Council